Linlithgow was a royal burgh that returned one commissioner to the Parliament of Scotland and to the Convention of Estates.

After the Acts of Union 1707, Linlithgow, Lanark, Peebles and Selkirk formed the Linlithgow district of burghs, returning one member between them to the House of Commons of Great Britain.

List of burgh commissioners

 1661–63: Andro Glen, merchant, provost 
 1665 convention: Robert Stewart, provost 
 1667 convention, 1669–74, 1678 convention: Robert Milne, merchant, provost  
 1685–86: Alexander Milne 
 1689 convention, 1689–98: William Higgins, merchant burgess (resigned to enter Church c.1699) 
 1700–02, 1702–07: Walter Stueart of Pardovein, former provost

See also
 List of constituencies in the Parliament of Scotland at the time of the Union

References

Constituencies of the Parliament of Scotland (to 1707)
Politics of West Lothian
History of West Lothian
Constituencies disestablished in 1707
1707 disestablishments in Scotland